John Sigismund Vasa (6 January 1652, Warsaw - 20 February 1652, Warsaw) was a Polish prince, the son of John II Casimir and Marie Louise Gonzaga.

Biography

His parents had vowed that he would spend two years as the novice of the Order of the Discalced Carmelites. However, he died before the age of two months; his sister, Maria Anna Teresa, had also died some months before John's birth. He was buried in the Vasa Crypt, at Wawel Castle in the Tomb of the Kings.

According to contemporary sources, though his name was Charles Louis (Karol Ludwik), on his coffin his name was inscribed as Jan Zygmunt (John Sigismund).

Ancestry

Notes

References
B. Fabiani: Habit princess. Portrait of Vasa in 1651 , [in:] Lorentz S., Michalowski, K., Yearbook of the National Museum in Warsaw, Vol. XVI, Warsaw, 1972, pp. 68, 76.
S. Ochmann-Staniszewska: Vasa dynasty in Poland, Warsaw 2006, pp. 211, 239.
Z. Wdowiszewski: Genealogy of the House of Jagiellon and Vasa in Poland, ed. Avalon, Kraków 2005, p. 239.

1652 births
1652 deaths
Burials at Wawel Cathedral
Royalty who died as children
Sons of kings
Heirs apparent who never acceded